The Global Education Network Europe (GENE) is the European network of ministries, agencies and other national bodies responsible for support, funding and policy-making in the field of global education. Started in 2001 with 6 national structures, GENE has grown to include structures from 25 countries leading the provision of global education in Europe, with combined annual budgets in excess of 150 million Euro.

Definition
Global education can be defined as: 
 ... education that opens people’s eyes and minds to the realities of the world, and awakens them to bring about a world of greater justice, equity and human rights for all. GE is understood to encompass Development Education, Human Rights Education, Education for Sustainability, Education for Peace and Conflict Prevention and Intercultural Education; being the global dimensions of Education for Citizenship.

Goals
The purpose of GENE is to support national structures in their work of improving the quality and increasing the provision of global education in Europe. GENE does this through networking and regular round table discussions, through peer learning and policy research, and through the development of national strategies.

Aims of GENE:

 To share experience and strategies among existing and emerging national structures, in order to inform best practice nationally and provide mutual support and learning.
 To disseminate learning from the participating countries to other countries in Europe, so that structures for Global Education subsequently emerging will learn from this experience, and so that, eventually, all countries in Europe might have national co-ordinating structures for the increase and improvement of global education.
To develop and pursue a common European agenda on strengthening global education.

The overarching aim of GENEs work is to improve the quality and provision of global education in Europe. The ultimate benchmark towards which GENE works is towards the day when all people in Europe will have access to quality global education. GENE achieves this through networking of national strategies, through peer learning, and through common projects, bilateral exchange and capacity building.

Participating Ministries and Agencies

Austria

 ADA, Austrian Development Agency
 Federal Ministry of Education, Science and Research, Austria
 KommEnt

Belgium

 FPS Foreign Affairs, Foreign Trade and Development Cooperation
 Enabel – Belgian Development Agency

Bulgaria

 Ministry of Education and Science

Czech Republic

Czech Development Agency

Estonia

 Ministry of Foreign Affairs
 Ministry for Education and Research
 Estonian National Commission for UNESCO

Finland

Ministry of Foreign Affairs,
EDUFI

France

 Ministry of Foreign Affairs and Development Cooperation
 AFD – French Development Agency

Germany

Engagement Global

Greece 

 Ministry of Foreign Affairs
 Ministry of National Education, Research and Religion

Hungary
Ministry for Foreign Affairs and Trade

Ireland

 Irish Aid, Department of Foreign Affairs
 Department of Education and Skills

Latvia 

 Ministry of Foreign Affairs
 Ministry of Education and Science

Lithuania 

 Ministry of Foreign Affairs
 Lithuanian Children and Youth Centre

Luxembourg 

 Ministry of Foreign and European Affairs

Malta 

 Ministry for Education and Employment
 Ministry for Foreign Affairs and Trade Promotion
 Education Malta Foundation

Montenegro 

 Ministry of Education

Norway

RORG Network

Poland
Ministry of Foreign Affairs
Ministry of National Education

Portugal

 Instituto Camões
 Directorate-General for Education – Ministry of Education
 CIDAC

Slovak Republic
Slovak Aid

Slovenia 

 Ministry of Foreign Affairs
 Ministry of Education, Science and Sport

Serbia 

 Ministry of Education, Science and Technological Development

Spain 

 AECID
 Ministry of Education, Culture and Sports

Sweden 

 Swedish Council for Higher Education

United Kingdom 

 Dfid

European global education peer review process
In 2002 the Maastricht Declaration identified the desirability of developing a system of peer review for global education in Europe. Following a 2003 feasibility study, the "European Global Education Peer Review Process" was established to increase and improve the provision of global education in Europe.  GENE and the North-South Centre worked closely together to develop this process.

The European Global Education Peer Review Process has, since late 2005, been facilitated by GENE, through its secretariat. The funding for the process and the peer review expertise has been provided by GENE participants.

The key aim of the Europe-wide process is to increase and improve support for, access to, and the impact of global education in European countries.  National reports, and the peer review processes leading to them, act as both a tool to enhance quality and impact nationally, and a mechanism for international comparative analysis, benchmarking and policy making.

National reports
To date 13 peer reviews have taken place. Estonia (2019), Cyprus (2017), Belgium (2016), Ireland (2015), Portugal (2013–14), Slovakia (2013–14), Norway (2009–10), Poland (2009–10), the Czech Republic (2008), Austria (2006), the Netherlands (2005), Finland (late 2004), and Cyprus (pilot review, early 2004). The first Global Education National Report, on Cyprus, was published in early 2004 as a pilot review being part of the initial feasibility study.

References

External links
Reports 
GENE website
Council of Europe's North South Centre
Useful explanation of Development Education

Educational organizations based in Europe
Organizations established in 2001